Solomon Chamberlin (July 30, 1788 – 1862) holds notoriety in the early Latter Day Saint movement for being the first to evangelize the printed Book of Mormon. He preached from proof sheets during a tour among Baptists and Reformed Methodists in New York and Upper Canada while the Grandin press in Palmyra, New York, prepared volumes for publication. Prior to his encounter with the Book of Mormon, Chamberlin published his own visionary experience as A Sketch of the Experience of Solomon Chamberlin (1829).

Chamberlin traveled to what would become Utah in 1847 as part of the Brigham Young Vanguard Company.

Notes

References
 http://www.boap.org/LDS/Early-Saints/SChamberlain.html

External links
 Solomon Chamberlain autobiography, MSS SC 1748 at L. Tom Perry Special Collections, Harold B. Lee Library, Brigham Young University

1788 births
1862 deaths
American Mormon missionaries in the United States
Converts to Mormonism from Methodism
American Mormon missionaries in Canada